Robert de Hoog  (born 18 November 1988) is a Dutch actor.

Filmography

Theatre

External links 
 
Robert de Hoog at Toneelgroep Amsterdam
 

1988 births
Living people
21st-century Dutch male actors
Dutch male actors
Dutch male film actors
Golden Calf winners
People from Leiderdorp